Spectre is eighth studio album by Laibach. It was released on March 3, 2014 under Mute Records.

Track listing 

Tracks 11-14 are bonus tracks, featured on the extended version of the album.

''Love On the Beat'' is a cover of a Serge Gainsbourg song. "See That My Grave Is Kept Clean" was written and originally recorded by Blind Lemon Jefferson.

References

2014 albums
Laibach (band) albums
Mute Records albums